Jean-Pierre Voisin (13 November 1932 – 19 August 2014) was a Swiss basketball player. He competed in the men's tournament at the 1952 Summer Olympics.

References

1932 births
2014 deaths
Swiss men's basketball players
Olympic basketball players of Switzerland
Basketball players at the 1952 Summer Olympics
Place of birth missing